HBB could refer to:

Science
 Hexabromobenzene
 Beta globin (HBB, β-globin or haemoglobin, beta) a globin protein in adult human hemoglobin A.
 Human β-globin locus

Places
 Headbangers Ball
 National Rail station code for Hubberts Bridge railway station, England

Television
 Has Bilgi Birikim - a defunct Turkish television channel.
 Hybrid Broadcast Broadband TV European initiative to combine broadcast television with the internet

Other
 Humongous Bank and Broker - Informal term used to denote very large financial institutions in the United States 
 Honey Badger Brigade (or Twitter account HoneyBadgerBite), a website launched November 2013 based on the Honey Badger Radio series launched August 2013 on BlogTalkRadio on the AVoiceforMen channel.
 Home-based business, a type of small business